China Europe International Business School (CEIBS) is a business school located in Shanghai, China.

Established under an agreement between the Chinese government and the European Commission in Shanghai in November 1994, CEIBS was the first business school in mainland China to offer a full-time MBA, an Executive MBA and a wide range of Executive Education programmes. CEIBS follows the European model of business schools. Its MBA programme has consistently ranked amongst the best in the world.

History

The school's predecessor, the China-EC Management Institute (CEMI), was launched in Beijing in 1984. After CEIBS was formally established in 1994 in collaboration with its partners European Foundation for Management Development (EFMD) and Shanghai Jiao Tong University, it later moved to Minhang in Shanghai. In 1994, CEIBS opened its main campus in Shanghai's Pudong district.

In May 2009 CEIBS started an EMBA programme in Ghana, being the first Asian business school to start such a programme in Africa. CEIBS was also the first Asian business school, and one of the very few around the globe, to become carbon neutral in 2011. In 2009, CEIBS became the first Chinese business school to make the world's Top 10 MBA ranking compiled by the FT.

In November 2015, CEIBS announced that it had acquired the Lorange Institute of Business of Zurich for 16.5 million Swiss francs, with plans to train over 200 Chinese managers per month.

The CEIBS Diaries
In June 2022, a 12-part series of posts detailing the negative experience of international students at CEIBS was published on Reddit by an account claiming to be a group of CEIBS MBA alumni.

Campus
Established in 1994, the main campus of CEIBS in Shanghai's Pudong district was designed by Henry N. Cobb and Ian Bader of Pei Cobb Freed & Partners and made CEIBS the first business school in mainland China with its own campus. In 2011, CEIBS began the 18-month construction of Phase 3 of the Shanghai campus which doubled its size to 7.5 million square meters.

CEIBS opened its Beijing campus on April 24, 2010, within Beijing's Zhonguangcun Software Park alongside the research centres of IBM, Oracle, Neusoft and more than 200 other leading technology companies. It effectively doubled the school's total number of classroom seats. Designed by the Spanish architectural firm IDOM, the Beijing campus hosts CEIBS EMBA programme and executive education courses. Each year, the CEIBS Beijing campus graduates almost 300 EMBA students and nearly 3,000 executive education participants. The campus is also a central meeting point for CEIBS alumni as Beijing is home to CEIBS’ second-largest alumni chapter (after Shanghai).

Academics
80% of the non-Chinese students who graduate from China Europe International Business School establish residence and work in the Asia-Pacific region.

Programs
 MBA
 Finance MBA (Part-time)
 MBA/Master of Arts in Law and Diplomacy (Coordinated with Fletcher School of Law and Diplomacy at Tufts University)
 MBA/Master of Public Health (Coordinated with Johns Hopkins Bloomberg School of Public Health) 
 MBA/Master of Management in Hospitality (Coordinated with Cornell University School of Hotel Administration) 
 Executive MBA (taught in Mandarin)
 DBA (taught in Switzerland and in Mandarin) 
 Global Executive MBA Shanghai cohort (taught in English)
 Global Executive MBA Zurich cohort (taught in English)
 Executive Education
 PhD in Management (Coordinated with Shanghai Jiaotong University)

Rankings
CEIBS MBA Programme:
 #1 in Asia, #20 globally full-time MBA Programme (2023): Financial Times
 #3 in Asia, #2 in China, Global Best Business School (2022): Bloomberg Businessweek
 #1 in Asia amongst 2-year programmes outside the US, 2019: Forbes Magazine

CEIBS Global EMBA Programme: 
 Top 20 Globally for 11 Consecutive Years (20102020), #2 worldwide and highest ranked stand-alone programme in 2020: Financial Times

Administration

In February 2011, former Harvard Business School professor John Quelch was appointed as vice president and dean of the business school. However, Quelch abruptly announced his resignation in November 2012.

Notable people

Faculty and staff
Romano Prodi, board member
Wu Jinglian, Honorary Professor
Xu Xiaonian, Professor of Economics and Finance

Alumni

Barbara Frances Ackah-Yensu, Justice of the Supreme Court of Ghana
Chen Hao, Governor of Yunnan province
Huang Nubo, Chairman, Beijing Zhongkun Investment Group
Lan Yu, fashion designer
Liu Qiangdong, Founder and President, JD.com who has been accused of rape multiple times
Maymunah Kadiri, Nigerian mental health advocate
Yang Lan, Co-founder, Sun TV

References

External links

 Official website (English version)
 China Europe International Business School - Pei Cobb Freed & Partners

Universities and colleges in Shanghai
Business schools in China